RPPS may refer to:

 Retropatellar Pain Syndrome, a knee condition
 Rockcliffe Park Public School
 Rose Park Primary School